The Alley Award was an American annual series of comic book fan awards, first presented in 1962 for comics published in 1961. Officially organized under the aegis of the Academy of Comic Book Arts and Sciences, the award shared close ties with the fanzine Alter Ego magazine. The Alley is the first known comic book fan award.

The Alley Awards were tallied for comic books produced during the previous year. The Alley statuette — a likeness of the comic strip character Alley Oop — was initially sculpted by Academy member Ron Foss out of redwood, from which "plaster duplications" were made to be handed out to the various winners.

History
The Alley Award traces its origin to "a letter to Jerry dated October 25, 1961" by Roy Thomas, in which he suggested that Jerry Bails' fanzine Alter-Ego, which had debuted in March 1961, create an award for fandom's "favorite comic books in a number of categories".

Initially suggested as the "Alter-Ego Award", the name evolved into the Alley Award after comic strip caveman Alley Oop, since, as Thomas reasoned, "surely a caveman had to be the earliest superhero chronologically". Comics historian Bill Schelly notes that no one "bothered to ask the NEA [newspaper] syndicate for permission to utilize V. T. Hamlin's comic strip character".

By the awards' third year, the number of ballots received had become so overwhelming that Bails called for a fan get-together at which votes could be tabulated by group effort. This gathering of Midwestern fans, held in March 1964 at the Detroit-area home of Bails, was dubbed the "Alley Tally", and its success provided inspiration for the organizing of comic book fan conventions that began soon afterward.

Results of the voting were published in the comics fanzines On the Drawing Board / The Comic Reader  The Alley Awards themselves were given out from 1962 to 1970 (for comics published 1961–1969, respectively), with comic strip awards added in 1967 (for calendar year 1966). The awards were presented at all three Academy Cons from 1965 to 1967. The final three years' awards were presented at Phil Seuling's New York Comic Art Convention.

After the dissolution of the Alleys, from 1971 to 1974 the Comic Art Convention presented the Goethe Awards/Comic Fan Art Awards.

Winners

1961
Source
Best Regularly Published Comic Book - Justice League of America  (DC Comics)
Best Adventure Hero(ine) Having Own Comic Book - Green Lantern  (DC Comics)
Best Adventure Hero(ine) Not Having Own Comic Book - Hawkman  (DC Comics)
Best Supporting Character - The Elongated Man  (DC Comics)
Best Cover - The Flash #123, "Flash of Two Worlds"  (DC Comics)
Best Single Issue - The Flash #123, "Flash of Two Worlds" [by Gardner Fox & Carmine Infantino]  (DC Comics)
Best Artist (Pencil or Ink) - Carmine Infantino
Best Story - The Flash #123, "Flash of Two Worlds"  (DC Comics)
Best Adventure-Hero Group - Justice League of America  (DC Comics)
Hero or Heroine Most Worthy of Revival - The Spectre  (DC Comics)
Worst Comic Book Currently Published - Wonder Woman  (DC Comics)

1962
Best Comic Book of the Year - Fantastic Four  (Marvel Comics)
Best Editor of a Comics Group - Julius Schwartz  (DC Comics)
Best Script Writer - Gardner Fox
Best Pencil Artist - Carmine Infantino
Best Inker - Murphy Anderson
Best Hero - Hawkman  (DC Comics)
Best Group of Heroes - Fantastic Four  (Marvel Comics)
Best Villain - Sub-Mariner (Fantastic Four)  (Marvel Comics)
Best Supporting Character - The Thing (Fantastic Four)  (Marvel Comics)
Best Short Story - "Origin of Spider-Man" by Stan Lee & Steve Ditko, Amazing Fantasy #15  (Marvel Comics)
Best Book-Length Story - "The Planet that Came to a Standstill", by Gardner Fox & Carmine Infantino, Mystery in Space #75  (DC Comics)
Best Single Comic Book Cover - The Brave and the Bold #42, by Joe Kubert  (DC Comics)
Comic Most in Need of Improvement - Batman  (DC Comics)
Hero/Heroine Most Worthy of Revival - The Spectre  (DC Comics)

"Ama" (Fan) Division
Comic Fanzines of 1961/62 - Alter-Ego, edited by Jerry Bails & Roy Thomas
Special Projects - Index to All Star Comics, by Jerry Bails
Articles - "The Light of Green Lantern", by Jerry Bails
Features - "Profiles on Collectors", by Biljo White
Strip - "Bestest League of America", by Roy Thomas
Fiction - "The Reincarnation of The Spectre", by Roy Thomas

1963
Source

Pro Categories
Best Editor - Stan Lee  (Marvel Comics)
Best Writer - Stan Lee
Best Artist - Carmine Infantino

Best Comics Categories
Adventure Hero - The Amazing Spider-Man  (Marvel Comics)
General Fantasy - Strange Adventures  (DC Comics) 
Mundane Fiction - Sgt. Fury and His Howling Commandos  (Marvel Comics)
Humorous - Uncle Scrooge  (Western Publishing)
Favorite Short Story - "The Human Torch Meets Captain America", by Stan Lee & Jack Kirby, Strange Tales #114  (Marvel Comics)
Favorite Annual - Fantastic Four Annual #1  (Marvel Comics)
Favorite Novel - "Crisis on Earths 1 and 2", by Gardner Fox & Mike Sekowsky, Justice League of America #21-22  (DC Comics)
Top Hero - Spider-Man  (Marvel Comics)
Top Group - The Fantastic Four  (Marvel Comics)
Top Supporting Character - The Thing (Fantastic Four)  (Marvel Comics)
Top Supporting Character - The Sub-Mariner (Fantastic Four)  (Marvel Comics)
Strip Favored for Revival - Doctor Fate  (DC Comics)

Amateur Division (on a scale of 1-5 points)
Article - "Minute Movies", by Hal Lynch & Vern Coriell (Comic Art #4) - 4.31 points
Illustrated Strip - "The Eclipse", by Drury Moroz & Ron Foss (Alter-Ego #5) - 4.22 points
Fanzine Fiction - "The Black Panther", by John Wright (Komix #2) - 4.06 points
Single Illustration - Cover, Star-Studded Comics #2, by Buddy Saunders - 4.28 points
Fan Project - Authoritative Index to DC Comics, by Howard Keltner & Jerry Bails - 4.50 points
Fan Artist - Ron Foss - 4.19 points
Fan Writer - Jerry Bails - 4.40 points
Comics Fanzine - The Comic Reader #15-20, by Jerry Bails - 4.53 points

Write-In Categories
 Strip that Should be Improved  - Justice League of America  (DC Comics)
Crossover of DC Heroes for The Brave and the Bold - Hawkman & the Flash  (DC Comics)
Artist Preferred on Sea Devils - Joe Kubert (DC Comics)
Artist Preferred on Justice League of America - Murphy Anderson (DC Comics)
Comic Displaying Best Interior Color Work - Mystery in Space  (DC Comics)

1964
Pro Categories
Best Adventure Hero Comic Book - The Amazing Spider-Man  (Marvel Comics)
Best Regularly Published Fantasy Comic - Forbidden Worlds  (American Comics Group)
Best Humorous Comic Book - Herbie
Best Miscellaneous Fiction - Sgt. Fury and His Howling Commandos  (Marvel Comics)
Best Editor - Stan Lee  (Marvel Comics)
Best Writer - Stan Lee
Best Pencil Artist - Carmine Infantino
Best Inking Artist - Murphy Anderson
Best Comic Book Cover - Detective Comics #329  (DC Comics)
Best Short Story - "Doorway to the Unknown", by John Broome & Carmine Infantino, The Flash #148  (DC Comics)
Best Novel - "Captain America Joins the Avengers", by Stan Lee & Jack Kirby, from The Avengers #4  (Marvel Comics)
Best Giant Comic - The Amazing Spider-Man Annual #1  (Marvel Comics)
Comic Regularly Displaying Best Color Work - Magnus, Robot Fighter  (Gold Key Comics)
Worst Regularly Published Comic - Wonder Woman
Best Hero - Spider-Man
Best Supporting Character - The Thing (Fantastic Four)  (Marvel Comics)
Best Villain - Doctor Doom (Fantastic Four  (Marvel Comics)
Best Group of Characters - The Fantastic Four  (Marvel Comics)
Best New Strip or Book - Captain America, by Stan Lee & Jack Kirby, in Tales of Suspense  (Marvel Comics)
 Strip Most Desired for Revival - The Spectre  (DC Comics)

Fan Categories (on a scale of 1-5 points)
Best Article in a Fanzine - (tie) "Lee", by Rick Weingroff (4.21 points); "One Man's Family", by Roy Thomas (4.21 points)
Best Regular Fanzine Feature - "Information Center", by Bob Jennings (4.17 points)
Best Fan Comic Strip - Adam Link, by Eando Binder, Bill Spicer and D. Bruce Berry (4.61 points)
Best Ditto/Mimeo Cover - Batmania #1, by Biljo White (4.46 points)
Best Cover (Other Reproduction) - Alter-Ego #7, by Biljo White (4.61 points)
Best Fan Fiction - "Nemesis of Evil", by Victor Baron (4.23 points) 
Best Fan Project - Who's Who and Supplement, by Jerry Bails & Larry Lattanzi (4.32 points)
Best Fanzine - Alter-Ego #7, by Roy Thomas (4.67 points)

1965
Source

Pro Categories
Best Adventure Hero Comic Book - The Amazing Spider-Man  (Marvel Comics)
Best Regularly Published Fantasy Comic - Strange Adventures  (DC Comics)
Best Humor Comic Book - Herbie
Best Miscellaneous Fiction - Sgt. Fury and His Howling Commandos  (Marvel Comics)
Best Editor - Stan Lee  (Marvel Comics)
Best Writer - Stan Lee
Best Pencil Artist - Wally Wood 
Best Inking Artist - Murphy Anderson
Best Comic Book Cover - The Brave and the Bold #61  (DC Comics)
Best Short Story - The Origin of the Red Skull, by Stan Lee & Jack Kirby, Tales of Suspense #66  (Marvel Comics)
Best Giant Comic - T.H.U.N.D.E.R. Agents #1, by Len Brown, Wally Wood, Reed Crandall, Gil Kane, George Tuska, Mike Sekowsky  (Tower Comics)
Best Novel - "Solomon Grundy Goes on a Rampage" Showcase #55, by Gardner Fox & Murphy Anderson  (DC Comics)
Comic Regularly Displaying Best Color Work - Magnus, Robot Fighter  (Gold Key Comics)
Comic Most Needing Improvement - Blue Beetle  (Charlton Comics)
Best Hero - Spider-Man  (Marvel Comics)
Best Supporting Character - The Thing (Fantastic Four)  (Marvel Comics)
Best Villain - Doctor Doom (Fantastic Four)  (Marvel Comics)
Best Group - The Fantastic Four  (Marvel Comics)
Best New Strip or Book - T.H.U.N.D.E.R. Agents, by Len Brown & Wally Wood  (Tower Comics)
Best Revived Hero - Doctor Fate  (DC Comics)
Strip or Book Most Desired for Revival - Justice Society of America  (DC Comics)

Fan Categories (on a scale of 1-5 points) 
Best Article - "With Comics Down Under", by John Ryan (4.51 points)
Best Regular Feature - "On the Drawing Board", by Glen Johnson & Derrill Rothermich (4.68 points)
Best Fan Comic Strip - "The End of Bukawai", Fantasy Illustrated #3 (4.48 points) 
Best Ditto/Mimeo Cover - Batmania #5, by Biljo White (4.38 points) 
Best Cover (Other Reproduction) - Alter-Ego #8, by Biljo White (4.57 points) 
Best Fan Fiction - "Powerman vs. the Blue Barrier", by George R. R. Martin (4.29 points)
Best Fan Project - New York Comicon, by Dave Kaler (4.63 points)
Best Fanzine - Alter-Ego #8, by Roy Thomas (4.71 points)

1966
Best Comic Magazine Section 
Adventure Book with the Main Character in the Title - The Amazing Spider-Man  (Marvel Comics)
Multi-Feature Title - Tales of Suspense  (Marvel Comics)
Super Hero Group Title - Fantastic Four  (Marvel Comics)
Normal Group Adventure Title - M.A.R.S. Patrol  (Gold Key Comics)
Fantasy/SF/Supernatural Title - Strange Adventures  (DC Comics)
Western Title - Kid Colt, Outlaw  (Marvel Comics)
War Title - Sgt. Fury and his Howling Commandos  (Marvel Comics)
Humor Title: Teenage - Archie  (Archie Comics)
Humor Title: Costumed - Inferior Five  (DC Comics)
Humor Title: Juvenile - Uncle Scrooge  (Western Publishing)
All-Reprint Title - The Spirit  (Harvey Comics)
Combination New & Reprint Material Title - Fantastic Four Annual  (Marvel Comics)

Best Professional Work  
Editor - Stan Lee  (Marvel Comics)
Writer - Stan Lee
Pencil Work - Al Williamson
Inking Work - Wally Wood
Cover - Flash Gordon #1, by Al Williamson  (King Comics)
Coloring - Flash Gordon  (King Comics)
Best Full-Length Story - "How Green was My Goblin", by Stan Lee & John Romita, Sr., The Amazing Spider-Man #39  (Marvel Comics)
Feature Story - "Return to Mongo", by Al Williamson, Flash Gordon #1  (King Comics)
Regular Short Feature - "Tales of Asgard" by Stan Lee & Jack Kirby, in The Mighty Thor  (Marvel Comics)
Hall of Fame - n.a.
Popularity Poll - n.a.

Newspaper Strip Section 
Best Adventure Strip - The Phantom, by Lee Falk
Best Human Interest Strip - On Stage (also known as Mary Perkins, On Stage), by Leonard Starr
Best Humor Strip - Peanuts, by Charles Schulz 
Best Humor Panel - Dennis the Menace, by Hank Ketcham 
Best Miscellaneous Strip - Feiffer, by Jules Feiffer
Hall of Fame Award - Flash Gordon, by Alex Raymond 
Best All-Time Great Comic Strip - Flash Gordon, by Alex Raymond

Fan Activity Section 
Best All-Article Fanzine - (tie) Batmania and TNT/Slam-BangBest All-Comics Fanzine - Odd 
Best All-Fiction Fanzine - BatwingBest Article/Comic Fanzine - Fantasy IllustratedBest Fiction/Comic Fanzine - Comic Art, by Don & Maggie Thompson 
Best Article/Fiction Fanzine - n.a. 
Best Fannish One-Shot - The Spirit (reprints), by Ed Aprill 
Best Article on Comic Book Material - "Quality Comics Group" 
Best Article on Newspaper Strips - "Pride of the Navy" 
Best Regular Fan Column - "What's News", by Dave Kaler 
Best Fan Fiction - "White Dragon Strikes" 
Best Fan Comic Strip - "Xal-Kor", by Richard "Grass" Green 
Best Fan Artist - Richard "Grass" Green 
Best Comic Strip Writer - Richard "Grass" Green 
Best Fan Project - Ed Aprill's reprints 
Best Newsletter - Dateline: Comicdom1967
Source

Best Comic Magazine Section 
Adventure Book with the Main Character in the Title - The Amazing Spider-Man  (Marvel Comics)
Adventure Hero Title with One or More Characters in Own Strip - Strange Tales  (Marvel Comics)
Super Hero Group Title - Fantastic Four  (Marvel Comics)
Non-Super-Powered Group Title - Challengers of the Unknown  (DC Comics)
Fantasy/SF/Supernatural Title - The Many Ghosts of Dr. Graves  (Charlton Comics)
Western Title - Ghost Rider  (Marvel Comics)
War Title - Sgt. Fury and his Howling Commandos  (Marvel Comics)
Humor Title: Teenage - Archie  (Archie Comics)
Humor Title: Costumed - Not Brand Echh  (Marvel Comics)
Humor Title: Juvenile - Uncle Scrooge  (Western Publishing)
All-Reprint Title - Fantasy Masterpieces  (Marvel Comics)
Combination New & Reprint Material Title - Marvel Super-Heroes  (Marvel Comics)

Best Professional Work 
Editor - Stan Lee  (Marvel Comics)
Writer - Stan Lee
Pencil Artist - Jack Kirby
Inking Artist - Joe Sinnott
Cover - Strange Adventures #207, by Neal Adams  (DC Comics)
Coloring - Magnus, Robot Fighter  (Gold Key Comics)
Full-Length Story - "Who's Been Lying in My Grave?", by Arnold Drake & Carmine Infantino, Strange Adventures #205  (DC Comics)
Feature Story - "Lost Continent of Mongo" by Archie Goodwin & Al Williamson, Flash Gordon #4  (King Comics)
Regular Short Feature - (tie) "Tales of Asgard" and "Tales of the Inhumans", both by Stan Lee & Jack Kirby, in The Mighty Thor   (Marvel Comics)
Hall of Fame - The Spirit, by Will Eisner

Popularity Poll
Best Costumed or Powered Hero - Spider-Man  (Marvel Comics)
Best Normal Adventure Hero - Nick Fury, Agent of S.H.I.E.L.D.  (Marvel Comics)
Best Super-Powered Group - Fantastic Four  (Marvel Comics)
Best Normal Adventure Group - Challengers of the Unknown  (DC Comics)
Best Male Normal Supporting Character - J. Jonah Jameson (The Amazing Spider-Man)  (Marvel Comics)
Best Female Normal Supporting Character - Mary Jane Watson (The Amazing Spider-Man)  (Marvel Comics)
Best Villain - Doctor Doom (Fantastic Four)  (Marvel Comics)
Best New Strip - "Deadman", by Arnold Drake & Carmine Infantino, in Strange Adventures  (DC Comics)
Best Revived Strip - "Blue Beetle"  (Charlton Comics)
Strip Most Needing Improvement - "Batman"  (DC Comics)
Strip Most Desired for Revival - "Adam Strange"  (DC Comics)

Newspaper Strip Section 
Best Adventure Strip - Prince Valiant, by Hal Foster
Best Human Interest Strip - On Stage (also known as Mary Perkins, On Stage), by Leonard Starr
Best Humor Strip - Peanuts, by Charles Schulz
Best Humor Panel - Dennis the Menace, by Hank Ketcham
Best Miscellaneous Strip - Ripley's Believe It or NotHall of Fame Award - Flash Gordon, by Alex Raymond

Fan Activity Section 
Best All-Article Fanzine - (tie) Batmania and Gosh WowBest All-Strip Fanzine - Star-Studded ComicsBest All-Fiction Fanzine - Stories of SuspenseBest Article/Strip Fanzine - Fantasy IllustratedBest Fiction/Strip Fanzine - Star-Studded ComicsBest Article/Fiction Fanzine - (tie) Gosh Wow and Huh!Best Fannish One-Shot - Fandom AnnualBest Article on Comic Book Material - "Blue Bolt and Gang" (Gosh Wow #1)
Best Article on Comic Strip Material - "Gully Foyle" (Star-Studded Comics #11) 
Best Regular Fan Column - "What's News", by Dave Kaler
Best Fan Fiction - "Nightwalker", by Larry Brody (Gosh Wow #1)
Best Fan Comic Strip - "Xal-Kor", by Richard "Grass" Green
Best Fan Artist - George Metzger
Best Comic Strip Writer - Larry Herndon
Best Fan Project - 1967 South-Western Con
Best Newsletter - On the Drawing Board, by Bob Schoenfeld

1968
Comic Magazine Section
Best Adventure Title - Winner: Fantastic Four; 2nd place: The Amazing Spider-Man  (Marvel Comics)
Best Fantasy/SF/Supernatural Title - Doctor Strange  (Marvel Comics)
Best Western Title - Bat Lash  (Dc Comics)
Best War Title - Sgt. Fury and his Howling Commandos  (Marvel Comics)
Best Humor Title - Not Brand Echh  (Marvel Comics)
Best Romance Title - Millie the Model  (Marvel Comics)
Best Reprint Title - Marvel Super-Heroes  (Marvel Comics)

Professional Work 
Best Editor - Stan Lee
Best Writer - Winner: Stan Lee; 2nd place: Roy Thomas
Best Pencil Artist - Winner: Jim Steranko; 2nd place: Jack Kirby
Best Inking Artist - Winner: Joe Sinnott; 2nd place: Wally Wood
Best Cover - Nick Fury, Agent of S.H.I.E.L.D. #6, by Jim Steranko  (Marvel Comics)
Best Full-Length Story - (tie) "Track of the Hook", by Bob Haney & Neal Adams, The Brave and the Bold #79  (DC Comics); "Origin of the Silver Surfer", by Stan Lee & John Buscema, The Silver Surfer #1  (Marvel Comics)
Best Feature Story - "Today Earth Died", by Jim Steranko, Strange Tales #168  (Marvel Comics)
Best Regular Short Feature - "Tales of the Inhumans", by Stan Lee & Jack Kirby, in The Mighty Thor (Marvel Comics)
Hall of Fame - Fantastic Four, by Stan Lee & Jack Kirby; Nick Fury, Agent of S.H.I.E.L.D., by Jim Steranko  (Marvel Comics)

Popularity Poll 
Best Adventure Hero Strip - The Amazing Spider-Man  (Marvel Comics)
Best Adventure Group Strip - Fantastic Four  (Marvel Comics)
Best Supporting Character - J. Jonah Jameson (The Amazing Spider-Man)  (Marvel Comics)
Best Villain - Doctor Doom (Fantastic Four)  (Marvel Comics)
Best New Strip - The Silver Surfer by Stan Lee & John Buscema  (Marvel Comics)
Strip Most Needing Improvement - X-Men  (Marvel Comics)
Strip Most Desired for Revival - "Adam Strange"  (DC Comics)

Newspaper Strip Section
Best Adventure Strip - Prince Valiant, by Hal Foster
Best Human Interest Strip - On Stage (also known as Mary Perkins, On Stage), by Leonard Starr
Best Humor Strip - Peanuts, by Charles Schulz
Best Humor Panel - Dennis the Menace, by Hank Ketcham
Best Miscellaneous Strip - Feiffer, by Jules Feiffer 
Hall of Fame - Peanuts, by Charles Schulz

Fan Activity Section
Best Limited Reproduction Fanzine - ConcussionBest Unlimited Reproduction Fanzine - Graphic Story MagazineBest Fan Artist - John Fantucchio 
Best Comic Strip Writer - Larry Herndon 
Best Fan Project - The Alley Awards

1969
 Sources
Best Comic Magazine Section
Best Adventure Title - Winner: Fantastic Four  (Marvel Comics)
Best Fantasy/SF/Supernatural Title - Doctor Strange  (Marvel Comics)
Best Western Title - Bat Lash  (DC Comics)
Best War Title - Star Spangled War Stories  (DC Comics)
Best Humor Title - Archie  (Archie Comics)
Best Romance Title - Young Love  (DC Comics)
Best Reprint Title - Marvel Super-Heroes  (Marvel Comics)

Professional Work
Best Editor - Dick Giordano (DC Comics)
Best Writer - Roy Thomas
Best Pencil Artist - Neal Adams
Best Inking Artist - Tom Palmer
Best Cover - Captain America #113, by Jim Steranko
Best Full-Length Story - "...And Who Shall Mourn for Him?", by Stan Lee, John Buscema & Sal Buscema, The Silver Surfer #5  (Marvel Comics)
Best Feature Story - "At the Stroke of Midnight", by Jim Steranko, Tower of Shadows #1 (Marvel Comics) 
Hall of Fame - "Deadman", by Neal Adams (DC Comics)

Special Awards
Carmine Infantino, "who exemplifies the spirit of innovation and inventiveness in the field of comic art".
Joe Kubert, "for the cinematic storytelling techniques and the exciting and dramatic style he has brought to the field of comic art".
Neal Adams, "for the new perspective and dynamic vibrance he has brought to the field of comic art".

Popularity Poll 
Best Adventure Hero Strip - The Amazing Spider-Man  (Marvel Comics)
Best Adventure Group Strip - Fantastic Four  (Marvel Comics)
 Best Fantasy/Mystery Character — Doctor Strange
Best Supporting Character - Rick Jones (The Incredible Hulk, The Avengers, and Captain America)  (Marvel Comics)
Best Villain - Doctor Doom (Fantastic Four)  (Marvel Comics)
Strip Most Needing Improvement - Superman  (DC Comics)

Newspaper Strip Section
Best Adventure or Human Interest Strip - Prince Valiant, by Hal Foster
Best Humor Strip or Panel - Peanuts, by Charles Schulz
Hall of Fame - Tarzan, by Burne Hogarth

Fan Activity Section
Best Limited Reproduction Fanzine - Newfangles by Don & Maggie Thompson
Best Unlimited Reproduction Fanzine - The Comic Reader''
Best Fan Artist - John Fantucchio
Best Comic Strip Writer - Mark Hanerfeld
Best Fan Project - 1969 New York ComiCon

See also
Bill Finger Award
Eagle Award
Eisner Award
Harvey Award
Inkpot Award
Kirby Award
National Comics Award
Russ Manning Award
Shazam Award

Further reading

References 

Comics awards